The 1931 World Series featured the two-time defending champion Philadelphia Athletics and the St. Louis Cardinals. The Cardinals beat the Athletics in seven games, a rematch and reversal of fortunes of the previous World Series.

The same two teams faced off during the 1930 World Series and the Athletics were victorious. The only day-to-day player in the Cardinals' lineup who was different in 1931 was the "Wild Horse of the Osage", Pepper Martin—a 27-year-old rookie who had spent seven seasons in the minor leagues.  He led his team for the Series in runs scored, hits, doubles, runs batted in and stolen bases, and also made a running catch to stifle a ninth-inning rally by the A's in the final game.

The spitball pitch had been banned by Major League Baseball in 1920, but those still using it at that time were "grandfathered", or permitted to keep throwing it for the balance of their big-league careers. One of those who "wet his pill" still active in 1931 was Burleigh Grimes, with two Series starts, two wins and seven innings of no-hit pitching in Game 3.  "Wild" Bill Hallahan started and won the other two for the Cards, and saved Game 7.

The Athletics had captured their third straight American League pennant, winning 107 games (and 313 from 1929–31). But this would prove to be the final World Series for longtime A's manager Connie Mack. As he did after the Boston "Miracle Braves" swept his heavily favored A's in the  Series, Mack would break up this great team by selling off his best players, this time out of perceived economic necessity rather than pique and competition from the short-lived Federal League. It would be the A's last World Series appearance in Philadelphia and it would be 41 years—and two cities—later before the A's would return to the Fall Classic, after their successive moves to Kansas City in 1955 and Oakland in 1968. This would also be the city of Philadelphia's last appearance in the Series until 1950. It was also the last World Series until the 2017 edition in which both teams who had won at least 100 games in the regular season went the maximum seven games.

This was the first World Series to feature a team with numbers on the back of the uniform (Philadelphia).

Summary

Matchups

Game 1

The A's scored four runs in the third, enabling Lefty Grove to win Game 1 despite giving up 12 hits, three by Pepper Martin. The Cardinals struck first in the first inning on three consecutive one-out singles, the last of which to Jim Bottomley scoring a run. After a strikeout, Martin's double scored another run. In the top of the third with runners on first and second, Mule Haas's double scored Philadelphia's first run. Two consecutive walks by Paul Derringer loaded the bases and tied the game, then Jimmie Foxx's single scored two more runs. In the top of the seventh, Al Simmons's two-run home run put Philadelphia up 6–2, the game's final.

Game 2

Pepper Martin's two hits and two stolen bases, scoring both Cardinal runs, supported Hallahan's three-hit shutout. The Cardinals scored the game's first run in the second when Pepper Martin doubled off of George Earnshaw, stole third and scored on Jimmy Wilson's sacrifice fly, and the game's second run in the seventh when Martin hit a leadoff single, stole second, moved to third on a groundout and scored on Charlie Gelbert's fielder's choice.

Game 3

Grimes pitched a two-hitter and contributed a two-run single in the fourth. He had a shutout until Al Simmons hit a two-run homer with two outs in the ninth. St. Louis struck first in the second when with runners on first and third via a walk and single, Jimmie Wilson's single and Charlie Gelbert's lineout scored a run each. They added to their lead in the fourth off of Lefty Grove on Burleigh Grimes's two-run single with runners on second and third, and added another run in the ninth off of Roy Mahaffey on Jim Bottomley's double.

Game 4

George Earnshaw pitched a brilliant two-hit shutout, walking one and striking out eight. Simmons RBI double in the first inning after a walk and two groundouts was all Earnshaw needed. Philadelphia added to their lead in the sixth off of Syl Johnson on Jimmie Foxx's home run and Jimmy Dykes's single after a Bing Miller double. Martin had both Cardinal hits.

Game 5

Martin was a thorn in the A's side in the series, getting three hits and four RBI to lead St. Louis to a 5-1 victory. Through five games, Martin leads all regulars with a .667 (12-18) average. St. Louis struck first in the first on Pepper Martin's sacrifice fly with runners on second and third. Martin's home run after a double in the sixth made it 3–0 Cardinals. The A's scored their only run in the seventh on Bing Miller's groundout after two one-out singles. The Cardinals added to their lead in the eighth when George Watkins walked off of Rube Walberg, stole second and scored on Martin's single and in the ninth off of Eddie Rommel on Charlie Gelbert's single with two on.

Game 6

The Athletics broke a scoreless tie with four runs in the fifth, Grove winning his second game of the series with a five-hitter, tying the series. After an error and walk off of Paul Derringer, Dib Williams's RBI single scored the game's first run. Two two-out walks loaded the bases and scored another run. Mickey Cochrane's RBI single scored a run, then a walk to Al Simmons scored another. St. Louis scored their only run in the sixth when Jake Flowers doubled and scored on Frankie Frisch's single. The A's added to their lead in the seventh off of Jim Lindsey. Max Bishop hit a leadoff single, moved to second on a bunt groundout, and scored on Al Simmons's single. After a single and hit-by-pitch loaded the bases, a walk to Jimmy Dykes scored a run and an error scored two more.

Game 7

The Cardinals struck first in the first when with runners on second and third via two single and a bunt groundout, a wild pitch by George Earnshaw to Pepper Martin scored a run and a strike three wild pitch to Ernie Orsatti scored another. A two-run home run by George Watkins in the third gave the Cardinals a 4-0 lead, but the Athletics scored two in the ninth on Doc Cramer's bases loaded two-run single, Hallahan getting the last out, saving the victory for Grimes. Despite going 0–for–6 in Games 6 and 7, Pepper Martin was the leading hitter of the series with a .500 (12–for–24) batting average.

Composite line score
1931 World Series (4–3): St. Louis Cardinals (N.L.) over Philadelphia Athletics (A.L.)

Notes

References

External links

 Video of 1931 World Series

World Series
World Series
St. Louis Cardinals postseason
Philadelphia Athletics postseason
World Series
1931 in sports in Pennsylvania
1930s in Philadelphia
1930s in St. Louis
October 1931 sports events
Baseball competitions in Philadelphia
Baseball competitions in St. Louis